Sannah 'Sana' Mchunu (born 19 March 1972), is a South African actress. She is best known for the roles in the television serials such as; eKasi: Our Stories, Muvhango, The River and Gomora.

Personal life
Mchunu was born on 19 March 1972 in Mofolo North, Soweto, South Africa. She could not finish school due to having children at a very young age.

At the age of 14, she became pregnant with her first child.She then welcomed her second child at the age of 19. She fell pregnant again after her parents sent her back to school. After her parents died, she lived with the father of her fourth child . When she became pregnant with her fifth child, her husband started to physically and emotionally abused her. After all that turmoil , she left the children with him. Currently, she is a mother to seven children.

Career
In her teen years, Sana used to dance for the late Brenda Fassie, which was later interrupted by her multiple pregnancies .  She went to audition under the guidance of her friend, Winnie Khumalo. She was later selected to star in eKasi: Our Storiesin a supporting role.

In 2013, Sana joined  the fifth season of e.tv anthology series eKasi: Our Stories and played the role "Mrs Simelane" often called "Sis K". She continued to star in the sixth season of the series playing multiple multiple roles such as "Rebecca", "Mrs. Khumalo", and "Gladys". She then played the role of "Grace Letsoalo" in the Mzansi Magic miniseries Vuka Mawulele. In the same year she appeared in two more serials: as "Mrs Qoboza" in SABC1 mystery thriller End Game, and as "Sibu" in Mzansi Magic miniserial Shabangu P.I.. In 2014, she appeared in most of the telecast television serials in South Africa: SABC1 drama Sticks and Stones (as "Aunty Nena"), SABC1 docudrama Amagugu (as "Lizzy"), SABC2 drama Gauteng Maboneng second season (as "Rebecca"), Moja Love telenovela Hope (as "Nelly") and in SABC1 drama thriller Ihawu (as "Rebo Modise"). Meanwhile, her most notable television role was as "Nomarashiya" in the SABC2 soap opera Muvhango.

In 2015, she joined the Mzansi Magic soap opera Isibaya and played the role "Ma Ruth".In 2016, she appeared in the second season of the Mzansi Magic serial It's Complicated as "Nobesuthu". In the same year, she appeared in the SABC2 telenovela Keeping Score and later starred as"Tryphina" in the second season of the SABC1 docudrama Ngempela. In 2017, she starred as the"Mayor's Wife" in the second season of the Mzansi Magic telenovela Ring of Lies and as "MaGumede" in the fourth season of the SABC1 comedy serial Ses'Top La.

In 2018, she starred in the 1Magic telenovela The River with the role "Matilda" and continued in the second season of the show.In 2019, she played the role of  "Mam Lindi" in e.tv supernatural serial Isipho and later joined the fourth season of the Mzansi Magic drama The Queen starring as "Tryphina". In 2020, Sana appeared in the Mzansi Magic telenovela Gomora as "Zodwa" where her role has received critical acclaim .

Filmography

Awards

References

1972 births
Living people
South African film actresses
South African television actresses